Leon Flint (born 22 February 2003) is a speedway rider from England.

Career
Flint began his British speedway career riding for Birmingham Brummies during the 2018 National League speedway season. In 2021 he rode in the top tier of British Speedway for the first time, riding for the Wolverhampton Wolves in the SGB Premiership 2021, in addition to riding for the Berwick Bandits in the SGB Championship 2021. 

In 2022, he rode for Wolverhampton again in the SGB Premiership 2022 and for the Berwick again in the SGB Championship 2022. During the season he won the 2022 British U21 title. He helped Valsarna win the Allsvenskan during the 2022 Swedish Speedway season.

In 2023, he re-signed for Berwick as their club captain for the SGB Championship 2023 and agreed to stay with Wolves for SGB Premiership 2023.

References 

2003 births
Living people
British speedway riders
Belle Vue Colts riders
Berwick Bandits riders
Birmingham Brummies riders
Wolverhampton Wolves riders